Cristian Rómulo Ojeda (born 22 January 1999) is an Argentine professional footballer who plays as an attacking midfielder for Talleres.

Club career
Before joining Talleres, Ojeda played for the Huracán de Posadas youth system from 2007 to 2013. Midway through the 2017–18 Argentine Primera División season, Talleres promoted Ojeda into their first-team squad. He made his debut on 26 January during a home victory over San Lorenzo. In February, Ojeda made three appearances at 2018 U-20 Copa Libertadores in Uruguay for the club's U20 team. On 1 March 2019, Ojeda joined USL Championship side Portland Timbers 2 on loan for their 2019 season. He scored his first senior goal in a 4–2 defeat at Casino Arizona Field to Phoenix Rising on 29 June.

Ojeda returned to Talleres at the end of 2019 after four goals in twenty-seven matches for the Americans, as he subsequently departed to Uruguayan football with Atenas in August 2020. He made his Segunda División debut on 18 August against Albion, prior to scoring his first goal for Atenas in a 2–2 draw with Villa Española on 1 September. He ended his loan in October after picking up a muscle injury.

International career
In March 2018, Ojeda was selected by the Argentina U20 team that trained and travelled with the seniors for friendlies with Italy and Spain.

Career statistics
.

References

External links

1999 births
Living people
People from Posadas, Misiones
Argentine footballers
Association football midfielders
Argentine expatriate footballers
Expatriate soccer players in the United States
Expatriate footballers in Uruguay
Argentine expatriate sportspeople in the United States
Argentine expatriate sportspeople in Uruguay
Argentine Primera División players
USL Championship players
Uruguayan Segunda División players
Talleres de Córdoba footballers
Portland Timbers 2 players
Atenas de San Carlos players
Sportspeople from Misiones Province